Taking a Cold Look is the sole studio album by i-Ten, a short-lived project formed of the songwriting duo Tom Kelly and Billy Steinberg, released in 1983. The album is typical of album-oriented rock and the duo worked with a number of famous rock musicians: Steve Lukather, David Paich and Steve Porcaro from Toto, Richard Page (who later formed Mr. Mister) and Mike Baird from Journey. The album was reissued on CD in June 2000 by Rewind Records and then in February 2009 by Rock Candy.

Reception 
The album was reviewed in Billboard: "With such credentials [of Steinberg and Kelly] and with Fleetwood Mac's producer and members of Toto helping out, the musical direction of i-TEN can be easily discerned. And, of course, the level of professionalism here cannot be surpassed. But is this a good album? AC programmers would say, yes."

The title track, released as a single, was reviewed in Cash Box and was described as having "stand-out production from pro Olsen and Toto-er Lukather. The side's dramatic reading and impressive guitar work give the group an edge in the late summer’s pop/rock derby."

The album has since been described as a "prime example of early '80s AOR, one needs look no further. Featuring trademark ’80s polish and sheen with catchy hooks that would not have sounded out of place on an album by Survivor, REO or even Styx, I-Ten’s Taking a Cold Look isn’t merely a time capsule of that era. It’s a clinic on why music of that era was so popular."

Covers 
The most-known cover is the 1987 version of "Alone" by Heart for their album Bad Animals, which topped the Billboard charts. A cover by Celine Dion in 2008 from her album Taking Chances also achieved chart success. The title track was covered by Honeymoon Suite, titled "Cold Look", for their 1988 album Racing After Midnight. "The Easy Way Out" was covered by Juice Newton in 1984 and by Jack Wagner in 1987. "I Don't Wanna Lose You" was covered by REO Speedwagon in 1988 for their compilation album The Hits.

Track listing

Personnel 
Musicians

 Tom Kelly  – vocals, guitar, keyboards
 Billy Steinberg  – vocals, guitar
 Steve Lukather – guitar, keyboards, synthesizer
 Alan Pasqua – keyboards, synthesizer
 Richard Page – backing vocals
 David Paich – keyboards, synthesizer
 Steve Porcaro – synthesizer
 Mike Baird – drums
 Dennis Belfield – bass
 Lenny Castro – percussion (track 5)
 Chas Sandford – rhythm guitar
 Peggy Sandvig – synthesizer (track 7)

Production and design

 John Kosh – art direction
 Ron Larson – design
 Andy Engel – Illustrations
 Keith Olsen – engineer
 Dennis Sager – engineer
 Greg Fulginiti – mastering
 Steve Porcaro – programming

2000 CD reissue:

 Jeff Willens – remastering
 Tom Laskey – reissue producer
 Dane Spencer – reissue preparation

References

1983 debut albums
Steve Lukather albums
Rock albums by American artists